Goodbye to the Music is a play by Sumner Locke Elliott.

References

External links
Goodbye to the Music at AusStage

Australian plays
1942 plays